Avrahm Yarmolinsky (January 13, 1890 – September 28, 1975) was an author, translator, and the husband of Babette Deutsch.

Yarmolinsky was head of the Slavonic Division of the New York Public Library from 1918 to 1955. He also taught at Columbia University and the City College of New York.

Books
 Dostoievsky, A Life
 A treasury of great Russian short stories - from Pushkin to Gorky
 A Treasury of Russian Verse
 Road to Revolution: A Century of Russian Radicalism 
 Turgenev: The Man, His Art and His Age
 The Russian Literary Imagination
 Russians: Then and Now - A Selection of Russian Writing from the Seventeenth Century of Our Own Day
 The Portable Chekhov - Viking Press, 1947

References

Further reading
S.J. Kunitz (ed.), Twentieth Century Authors, first supplement (1955)
H.M. Lyndenberg, in: New York Public Library Bulletin, 59 (March 1955), 107–32, list of works
R. Yachnin, ibid., 72 (June 1968), 414–9, list of works 1955–67
Bulletin of New York Public Library, March, 1955;
Chicago Sunday Tribune, May 3, 1959;
New York Times Book Review, May 10, 1959;
Commonweal, August 28, 1959

External links

 
 
 

American literary critics
20th-century American historians
American male non-fiction writers
Historians of Russia
Russian–English translators
American people of Russian-Jewish descent
Columbia University faculty
City College of New York faculty
Literature educators
1890 births
1975 deaths
Ukrainian Jews
University of Neuchâtel alumni
City College of New York alumni
Columbia University alumni
20th-century translators
Ukrainian expatriates in Switzerland
20th-century American male writers